Gary G. Ghahremani is an Iranian-American radiologist specializing in diagnostic and gastrointestinal imaging with over 40 years experience as Professor of Radiology. His work has been cited in over 5000 medical papers.

Career
After retiring as Evanston Hospital's Professor and chairman in the Department of Diagnostic Radiology, Ghahremani became a Clinical Professor of Radiology at the University of California Medical Center in San Diego. He is author of the textbook Iatrogenic Gastrointestinal Complications. As of 2022, Ghahremani has published over 150 scientific articles.

Awards and honors
 JT O’Connell Award (Illinois Medical Society,1989)
 Magna cum laude (RSNA Scientific Exhibit,1997)
 Lifetime Achievement Award (UCSD-Radiology, 2009)
 Paul C. Hodges Excellence Award (University of Chicago- Radiology, 2011)

References

Living people
People from Tehran
Iranian emigrants to the United States
American radiologists
University of Freiburg alumni
Alborz High School alumni
Northwestern Medicine faculty
University of California, San Diego faculty
1941 births